Mycobacterium shimoidei is a slowly growing non-pigmented species of mycobacteria. It is rarely associated with lung disease in humans. It was first isolated in 1975.

References

External links	
Type strain of Mycobacterium shimoidei at BacDive -  the Bacterial Diversity Metadatabase

shimoidei
Bacteria described in 1982